Demon Circus is a 1923 German silent drama film directed by Emil Justitz and starring Gertrude Welcker, Eduard von Winterstein, and Carl de Vogt. It is part of the Circus film genre. The film's sets were designed by the art director Hans Jacoby.

Cast

References

Bibliography

External links

1923 films
Films of the Weimar Republic
Films directed by Emil Justitz
German silent feature films
Circus films
German black-and-white films
German drama films
1923 drama films
Silent drama films
1920s German films
1920s German-language films